"Lil' Dub Chefin'" is a single by Spacemonkeyz vs Gorillaz, from the 2002 Gorillaz remix album Laika Come Home. It is sung by Damon Albarn and Terry Hall of the UK ska band the Specials with the song itself being a remix of the Gorillaz song "M1 A1". The song's title is reference to the UK restaurant chain Little Chef. The music video features the Spacemonkeyz. On Phase One: Celebrity Take Down, the video had an alternative intro and credits. The single peaked at No. 73 on the UK Singles Chart.

This track was only performed once on the band's first tour, Gorillaz Live, in 2002 with Terry Hall returning to sing it. Later, it was played live regularly during the last leg of The Now Now Tour as an outro to the original song it remixes, "M1 A1".

Track listings
 CD single
 "Lil' Dub Chefin'" (album version) – 4:28
 "Lil' Dub Chefin'" (radio edit) – 3:02
 "Spacemonkeyz Theme" – 5:19
 "Lil' Dub Chefin'" (music video) – 3:28

 12-inch vinyl and Cassette single
 "Lil' Dub Chefin'" (album version) – 4:28
 "Lil' Dub Chefin'" (radio edit) – 3:02
 "Spacemonkeyz Theme" – 5:19

Personnel
Damon Albarn – vocals
Terry Hall – vocals
Mike Smith – horn, horn arrangement
Dennis Rollins – horn
Dominic Glover – horn
Phil Soul – bass
Dubversive – keyboards, bass guitar, guitar
D-Zire – sampled loops, drum programming
Gavva – drum programming
Simon Katz – organ
Jeff Scantlebury – percussion
Jason Cox – engineering
Tom Girling – engineering, Pro Tools

References

2002 songs
2002 singles
Gorillaz songs
Terry Hall (singer) songs
Parlophone singles
Astralwerks singles
Dub songs
British reggae songs
Songs written by Damon Albarn
Songs written by Jamie Hewlett